Sharon Tomiko Ito (born September 3, 1960, in Sacramento, California) is a Japanese-American journalist who worked in broadcasting for 30 years.

Biography 
Sharon Ito was born in Sacramento, California. She graduated from Sacramento's Hiram Johnson High School in 1978 and later from the University of the Pacific in Stockton, California with a Bachelor of Arts degree in communications. Ito was recognized with multiple awards during her career including a Golden Mike Award from the Los Angeles Radio-TV News Directors Association for her work during the 1992 Los Angeles riots. She was also recognized by the Society of Professional Journalists (Sacramento chapter) for feature reporting. She was active with the Sacramento chapter of the Asian American Journalists Association (AAJA).

After working at radio stations KJOY Stockton and KGNR in Sacramento, Ito began her TV career at KXTV News10 in Sacramento in 1985 as a producer and news reporter. She left in 1990 to join Disney's startup television station KCAL-TV in Los Angeles as a reporter, and in 1993 came back home to KRBK-TV/KPWB-TV, now known as KMAX CW 31 in Sacramento. In September 1996, she returned to KXTV as weekend anchor and weekday reporter. In April 2002, Ito switched spots with weekday morning anchor Alicia Malaby and anchored News10 Good Morning from April 2002 to March 2007 with Dan Elliott. In May 2007 KXTV launched an online project on news10.net called Live_Online, with Ito interviewing newsmakers and interacting with viewers. Ito retired from broadcast news and left the station on March 25, 2012.

In 2013 Ito joined Sacramento State University's College of Continuing Education where she works in communications and public affairs.

Personal 
Ito lives in Sacramento and is married to former KXTV News10/ABC10 reporter George Warren. They have one daughter.

References

External links
 
 Sharon Ito's Facebook account

Living people
Television anchors from Sacramento, California
Television anchors from Los Angeles
1960 births
University of the Pacific (United States) alumni